Euptera falsathyma is a butterfly in the family Nymphalidae. It is found in Cameroon, Gabon, the Republic of the Congo, the Central African Republic and the north-eastern part of the Democratic Republic of the Congo.

References

Butterflies described in 1916
Falsathyma
Insects of Cameroon
Fauna of Gabon
Fauna of the Republic of the Congo
Fauna of the Central African Republic
Fauna of the Democratic Republic of the Congo
Butterflies of Africa